Street Fame is Twisted Black's third album. It was released on March 6, 2007. The first single is "I'm A Fool With It". The second single is "Throw It Up" featuring Chyna Whyte and Yo Gotti.

Track listing
 "Throw It Up" (feat. Yo Gotti and Chyna Whyte)
 "Shake" (feat. Butta)
 "Wat Y'All Wanna Do" (feat. Mike Dollars, Syl)
 "S.W.A.C."
 "The Block"
 "How You Feel About That" (feat. Gold Finger)
 "Broke Street" (feat. Sielio, Thump, Hogg)
 "Bout That" (feat. Keese, Kylo)
 "Coldest Summer Ever" (feat. DL Marshall)
 "New Boot"
 "Hustler's Prayer"
 "I'm A Fool Wit It"
 "Keep It Simple"
 "Walk A Mile In My Shoes"
 "It's A Jungle"
 "Touch Toes"

References

2007 albums
TVT Records albums
Albums produced by DJ Toomp